Greg Chaisson (born August 9, 1958 in Toronto, Canada) is a bass guitarist, singer, songwriter, and producer who has played in various bands, most notably Badlands, which featured former Ozzy Osbourne guitarist Jake E. Lee, vocalist Ray Gillen, and drummers Eric Singer and Jeff Martin, respectively.

Biography

Chaisson got his start in a popular local Phoenix, Arizona band called Ghost Rose but his first recordings of note came with Surgical Steel and St. Michael, two early 1980s Phoenix bands that both featured his future Badlands bandmate, Jeff Martin.  St. Michael would contribute the song "The Beauty, The Power" to the U.S. Metal Vol. IV compilation while Surgical Steel appeared on Metal Massacre II with "Rivet Head".

Chaisson then made the move to Los Angeles, CA  where he joined one of the last incarnations of Steeler where he was replaced by his younger brother, Kenny, when the band morphed into Keel. Chaisson would join a succession of L.A. bands, including Legs Diamond, Hellion, and Terriff (with future Ozzy guitarist Joe Holmes). In 1986, he unsuccessfully auditioned for Ozzy Osbourne's band where he met Jake E. Lee who invited him to try out for Badlands a couple of years later.

After the demise of Badlands, he joined Sircle of Silence, featuring one-time Accept vocalist David Reece, but left before the first album was recorded. In the ensuing years, Chaisson kept busy recording with the Blindside Blues Band, Die Happy, Red Sea, Pat Travers, and Darrell Mansfield, among others. In 1994, he released a solo album, It's About Time, which featured former Badlands bandmate Eric Singer on drums, ex-St. Michael guitarist Jim McMellen, and Riverdogs alumni, Rob Lamothe and Marc Danzeisen. Chaisson briefly united with former Badlands bandmate Jake E. Lee when he joined his new band Red Dragon Cartel in 2014 but was forced to bow out less than a year later after being diagnosed with cancer.

Chaisson resides in Phoenix, AZ with his wife and children where he coaches and teaches baseball and manages Bizarre Guitar & Drum. Additionally, he plays in an original band named Kings of Dust which features vocalist Michael Beck who briefly fronted Red Dragon Cartel, guitarist Ryan McKay, and drummer Jimi Taft. In 2021, Beck was replaced by Ken Ronk on vocals and the band's name was changed to Atomic Kings.

Discography

Greg Chaisson
 It's About Time (1994)

Badlands
 Badlands (1989) Voodoo Highway (1991)
 Dusk (1998)

Die Happy
Volume 2 (1993) 
Intense Live Series Vol. 4 (1993)

Blindside Blues Band
 Blindside Blues Band (1993)
 Blindsided (1994)
 Messenger Of The Blues (1995)

Pat Travers
 Just A Touch (1993)

Red Sea
 Blood (1994)

Craig Erickson
 Two Sides Of The Blues (1994)

Darrell Mansfield
 Mansfield & Co. (1995)

Stephen Christian
 Stephen Christian (1998)

Steeler
 Metal Generation: The Steeler Anthology (2005)
 American Metal: The Steeler Anthology (2006)

Chris Catena's Rock City Tribe
 Truth in Unity (features in the song "The Trickster") (2020)

Kings of Dust
 Kings of Dust (2020)

Compilations

Surgical Steel
 Metal Massacre II (1982)

St. Michael
 U.S. Metal Vol. IV (1984)

References

External links 
 Greg Chaisson Facebook page
 Kings of Dust Facebook page

20th-century Canadian bass guitarists
Badlands (American band) members
Living people
Musicians from Toronto
Steeler (American band) members
Die Happy (band) members
1958 births